Aplow, or Valuwa, is a village located on the eastern part of Motalava island, in the Banks Islands of Vanuatu. Located close to it is the island's airport, Valua airport.

Aplow also designates the whole district around this village, corresponding to the eastern side of the island; in this sense, Aplow contrasts with Mwotlap, which strictly speaking designates the western half of Motalava island.

The area of Aplow used to be home of a communalect (language or dialect) known as Volow. Volow become extinct in the 1980s, as its speakers adopted the dominant language Mwotlap from the western side.

Name
The name Aplow  is the name of the village in Mwotlap, which is the dominant language spoken today on the island. The same village was originally known as Volow  in  the now extinct  language of the same name.

Finally, the village, as well as the district around it, are sometimes designated as Valuwa  (or wrongly as Valua). this reflects the form of the word in Mota, the language of the neighbouring island which missionaries once used as the contact language in the whole region.

All these forms descend from a reconstructed *Valuwa in the Proto-Torres-Banks language, e.g. *Vaˈluwa > . The Mwotlap form incorporates a locative prefix: *ˌa-Vaˈluwa > * > .

Notes

References

Populated places in Vanuatu
Torba Province